The Masters of Evil is a fictional supervillain team appearing in American comic books published by Marvel Comics. Although the roster has changed over the years, the team remains the principal foes, and the evil counterpart, of the superhero team the Avengers.

Listed here are the known members of the Masters of Evil.

Membership
listed alphabetically, after leader

Baron Heinrich Zemo's incarnation
Avengers #6-7, 9-10, 15-16 (July 1964 - May 1965)

 Baron Heinrich Zemo (leader) - He is an old enemy of Captain America from World War II.
 Black Knight (Nathan Garrett) - A descendant of Sir Percy of Scandia and an enemy of Giant-Man who uses an arsenal of medieval weapons that employ modern technology (including a lance that fired bolts of energy) and genetically engineers and creates a winged horse called Aragorn.
 Enchantress (Amora) - An Asgardian sorceress and an enemy of Thor.
 Executioner (Skurge) - A half-giant companion of Enchantress and an enemy of Thor.
 Melter - An enemy of Iron Man who uses melting devices.
 Radioactive Man - A nuclear physicist with radioactive abilities and an enemy of Thor.
 Wonder Man - The owner of Williams Innovations who gains his ion-based powers from an ion ray. He sacrificed himself to save the Avengers.

Ultron's incarnation

Avengers #54-55 (July - Aug. 1968); 83 (Dec. 1970)

 Ultron-5 (leader) - A robot that was created by Hank Pym.
 Black Knight (Dane Whitman) - The nephew of Nathan Garrett. He joined the team with the intention of betraying them.
 Klaw - A sound-based supervillain who is an enemy of the Black Panther and the Fantastic Four.
 Whirlwind - A mutant with wind-based abilities who is an enemy of Giant-Man and the Wasp.
 Melter
 Radioactive Man

Egghead's incarnation
Avengers #222 (Aug. 1982); 227 - 229 (Jan. - Mar. 1983)

 Egghead (leader) - A mad scientist with an egg-shaped head who is an enemy of Hank Pym.
 Beetle (Abner Jenkins) - A supervillain in beetle-themed armor who is an enemy of Spider-Man.
 Moonstone - A supervillain whose powers derive from an alien gem who previously fought Captain America and the Hulk.
 Radioactive Man
 Scorpion (Mac Gargan) - A scorpion-themed supervillain who is an enemy of Spider-Man.
 Shocker (Herman Schultz) - A supervillain wielding vibration gauntlets who is an enemy of Spider-Man.
 Tiger Shark - A tiger shark-themed supervillain who is an enemy of Namor the Sub-Mariner.
 Whirlwind

Baron Helmut Zemo's first incarnation
Avengers #273 - 277 (Nov. 1986 - Mar. 1987)
 Baron Helmut Zemo (leader) - The son of Baron Heinrich Zemo.
 Absorbing Man - A supervillain who can absorb the properties of anything and is an enemy of Thor and the Hulk.
 Blackout (Marcus Daniels) - A Darkforce-manipulating supervillain.
 Black Mamba - A member of the Serpent Society who has Darkforce energy control and illusion-casting abilities. She is an associate who appears as Tanya Sealy.
 Fixer (Paul Norbert Ebersol) - A genius-level criminal inventor.
 Goliath (Erik Josten) - A size-shifting supervillain who the Enchantress put through the same procedure as Wonder Man.
 Grey Gargoyle - An enemy of Thor who can temporarily turn anything he touches to stone.
 Mister Hyde - A biochemist and an enemy of Thor who is inspired by the novel Strange Case of Dr. Jekyll and Mr. Hyde and takes a formula that grants him a similar transformation.
 Moonstone
 Screaming Mimi - A supervillain with a sonic scream.
 Tiger Shark
 Titania - A super-strong supervillain who is the love interest of the Absorbing Man.
 Whirlwind
 The Wrecking Crew - A group of supervillains that are enemies of Thor.
 Bulldozer - A supervillain with an armored metal helmet who fights by ramming his victims head-first.
 Piledriver - A supervillain who fights with his oversized pile-driving fists.
 Thunderball - The group's thinker who wields a huge demolition ball on a chain.
 Wrecker - The team's leader who wields an indestructible crowbar with magical properties. He both hates and fears Thor.
 Yellowjacket - A reluctant supervillain who uses one of Hank Pym's stolen Yellowjacket costumes.

Doctor Octopus' incarnation
 Doctor Octopus (leader) - A supervillain with four metal tentacles who is an enemy of Spider-Man.
 Absorbing Man
 Gargantua - A 25 ft. supervillain that used to work as a biochemist for S.H.I.E.L.D.
 Jackhammer - A super-strong supervillain who used to work for Silvermane's HYDRA branch.
 Oddball - A juggler and street fighter that is a member of the Death-Throws.
 Powderkeg - A super-strong villain who can also sweat a nitroglycerin compound.
 Puff Adder - A mutant and Serpent Society member with the power to breathe various debilitative gases (in one instance, the gas was able to eat away a metal lock) and inflate his body mass to a certain extent. He also has superhuman strength and increased physical durability.
 Shocker (Herman Schultz)
 Titania
 Yellowjacket (Rita DeMara)

Baron Helmut Zemo's second incarnation / the Thunderbolts

Avengers #270-277 (Aug. 1986 - Mar. 1987), Amazing Spider-Man #283 (Dec. 1986) and West Coast Avengers (vol. 2) #16 (Jan. 1987).
 Baron Helmut Zemo (leader)
 Beetle / MACH-1
 Fixer / Techno
 Goliath / Atlas
 Moonstone / Meteorite
 Screaming Mimi / Songbird

The Crimson Cowl's first incarnation
 Crimson Cowl (leader) - The daughter of Justin Hammer.
 Aqueduct - A supervillain who can control and shape water.
 Bison - A bison-themed supervillain who was transformed from an injured basketball player by the Egyptian god Seth and had previously fought Luke Cage and Thunderstrike.
 Blackwing - The son of Silvermane and an enemy of Captain America and Daredevil, who is an expert bat trainer.
 Boomerang - A boomerang-wielding supervillain and an enemy of Spider-Man.
 Cardinal - A supervillain who wears an armored suit that can fly and has a number of offensive weapons including energy blasters, a grenade launcher and a tar gun. 
 Constrictor - A boa constrictor-themed supervillain and former S.H.I.E.L.D. agent.
 Cyclone (Pierre Fresson) - A supervillain who wears a costume that enables him to create tornado-force whirlwinds.
 Dragonfly - A dragonfly-themed supervillain and former Maggia member who can fly and has a hypnotic gaze.
 Eel (Edward Lavell) - A supervillain who wears an electrified lubricated suit.
 Flying Tiger - A supervillain whose tiger-like body armor makes him capable of powered flight, as well as giving him enhanced strength, durability and endurance, and a set of claws. 
 Icemaster - A cryokinetic supervillain.
 Joystick - A supervillain with super-strength and super-speed who also wears a wrist device that creates energy batons.
 Klaw
 Lodestone - A supervillain who can manipulate the magnetic force.
 Man-Ape - A supervillain from Wakanda and an enemy of the Black Panther.
 Man-Killer - A supervillain with super-strength and size-shifting abilities.
 Quicksand - A supervillain who can transform her body into a sand-like substance.
 Scorcher - A supervillain and an enemy of Spider-Man whose insulated suit has flamethrower equipment.
 Shatterfist - A supervillain and an enemy of Thor who wields power gloves that delivers devastating blows.
 Shockwave - A supervillain and an enemy of Shang-Chi whose suit enables him to generate an electric shock.
 Slyde - A supervillain and skilled chemist whose suit grants him super-speed.
 Sunstroke - A solar-manipulating supervillain created by Dominus.
 Supercharger - A supervillain who can absorb, store, and release electricity.
 Tiger Shark

The Crimson Cowl's second incarnation
 The Crimson Cowl (leader)
 Black Mamba
 Cardinal
 Cyclone (Pierre Fresson)
 Gypsy Moth - A telekinetic gypsy moth-themed supervillain.
 Hydro-Man - A supervillin and an enemy of Spider-Man who can generate, control, and become water.
 Machinesmith - A robotic genius who can transfer his mind into other machines.
 Man-Killer

The Shadow Council's incarnation
 Max Fury (first leader) - A rogue Life Model Decoy of Nick Fury.
 Baron Helmut Zemo (second leader)
 Bi-Beast - An android whose has a second head on top of his head.
 Black Talon (Samuel Barone) - A voodoo magician.
 Brothers Grimm (Percy and Barton Grimes) - Two brothers whose costumes enable them to produce matter.
 Carrion (William Allen) - A former S.H.I.E.L.D. scientist exposed to the Carrion virus.
 Constrictor
 Crossfire - A former CIA interrogation expert who became an arms dealer.
 Daimon Hellstrom - The half-human son of the demon Marduk Kurios (a.k.a. "Satan") who became Baron Zemo's magic expert.
 Diablo - An alchemist who is an enemy of the Fantastic Four.
 The Eel (Edward Lavell)
 Firebrand - A mutated eco-terrorist.
 Griffin - A beastly supervillain.
 Killer Shrike - A mercenary who was enhanced by Roxxon Energy Corporation
 Lady Stilt-Man (Callie Ryan) - A female counterpart of Stilt-Man.
 Lascivious - A former member of the Grapplers who was given seduction-based powers.
 Letha - An acrobatic wrestler and former member of the Grapplers.
 Madame Masque - She serves as Baron Zemo's right-hand woman.
 Madcap - An insanity-inducing supervillain.
 Pink Pearl - An obese woman with super-strength who is an enemy of Alpha Flight.
 Porcupine (Roger Gocking) - A porcupine-themed supervillain.
 Princess Python - A former member of the Serpent Society and the Circus of Crime who owns a pet African rock python.
 Ringer - A ring-themed supervillain
 Satannish - An extra-dimensional demon.
 Squid (Don Callahan) - A squid-themed supervillain.
 Tiger Shark
 Tinkerer - A scientific genius who makes weapons and equipment for supervillains.
 Vengeance (Kowalski) - A former deputy who wields a hellfire shotgun.
 Whiplash (Anton Vanko) - A Russian scientist who wields energy whips.
 The Wrecking Crew
 Bulldozer
 Piledriver
 Thunderball
 Wrecker
 The Young Masters - A young counterpart of the Masters of Evil who are trained by the Constrictor.
 Alex Wilder - A former member of the Runaways who was resurrected by Daimon Hellstrom.
 Black Knight (unnamed female) - A female incarnation of the Black Knight.
 Coat of Arms - A swordswoman whose magic coat grants her six arms.
 Egghead II - A robot.
 The Enchantress (Sylvie Lushton) - A sorceress who claims to be an Asgardian.
 Excavator - The teenage son of Piledriver and a temporary member of the Wrecking Crew. Excavator wielded an enchanted shovel.
 The Executioner (Daniel DuBois) - A vigilante who is the son of Princess Python.
 Mako - A test tube Atlantean who was grown from the cell samples of Attuma, Orka, Tyrak, and U-Man.
 The Melter (Christopher Colchiss) - A superhuman and leader of the Young Masters who can cause objects to melt.
 Mudbug - A mutant with a crayfish physiology who was a former student of the Hellfire Club's Hellfire Academy.
 The Radioactive Kid - A young criminal in a hazmat suit has demonstrated the ability to melt and mutate human flesh with a touch.
 Snot - A former student of the Hellfire Academy who can propel large amounts of snot from his nose.

Lightmaster's incarnation
 Lightmaster (leader) - A supervillain whose suit enables him to manipulate light.
 The Absorbing Man
 Blackout
 Mister Hyde
 Titania
 Whirlwind
 Wrecking Crew
 Bulldozer
 Piledriver
 Thunderball
 Wrecker

Baron Helmut Zemo's third incarnation
 Baron Helmut Zemo (leader)
 Atlas
 Fixer
 Klaw
 Man-Killer
 Moonstone
 Tiger Shark
 Whiplash
 Wrecking Crew
 Bulldozer
 Piledriver
 Thunderball
 Wrecker

The West Coast Masters of Evil
 Madame Masque (leader)
 Derek Bishop - The father of Kate Bishop, a.k.a. Hawkeye.
 Eleanor Bishop - The mother of Kate Bishop who was revived as a vampire.
 Eel
 Graviton - A supervillain with control over gravity.
 Lady Bullseye - A ninja.
 MODOK Superior - A clone of MODOK with the cloned brain of his predecessor.
 Satana the Devil's Daughter (Satana Hellstrom) - The sister of Daimon Hellstrom.

Multiversal Masters of Evil
 Doom Supreme (leader) - A version of Doctor Doom from an unidentified reality who is the master of the darkest arts.
 Black Skull - A version of Red Skull from an unidentified reality who possesses the Venom Symbiote.
 Dark Phoenix - An unidentified golden-skinned female host of the Phoenix Force who wears a dark robe. Her appearance is revealed to be the form of a Mystique variant from Earth-14412.
 Berserkers - The pets of Dark Phoenix who consider her their mother.
 Hound - An unidentified alternate reality version of Wolverine that is loyal to Dark Phoenix and has spikes coming out of his body.
 An unidentified reality version of Thor.
 Ghost Goblin - A version of Green Goblin from an unidentified reality with the powers of Ghost Rider who can also throw flaming skull-shaped Noggin Bombs.
 Kid Thanos - A younger version of Thanos that was apparently taken from the past.
 King Killmonger - A variation of Erik Killmonger conqueror of Wakanda and Asgard from an unidentified reality who is wearing an armor that resembles the Destroyer laced with Vibranium.

Other versions
listed alphabetically, after leader

Marvel Adventures
 Abomination
 Baron Zemo
 Leader
 Ultron

House of M
 Hood (leader)
 Absorbing Man
 Batroc the Leaper
 Blizzard (Donnie Gill)
 Chemistro (Calvin Carr)
 The Cobra (Klaus Voorhees)
 The Constrictor
 Crossbones
 Madame Masque
 Mister Hyde
 Nitro
 Sandman
 Titania
 Wizard
 Wrecking Crew
 Bulldozer
 Piledriver
 Thunderball
 The Wrecker

Other media
listed alphabetically, after leader

The Avengers: United They Stand
 Baron Helmut Zemo (leader)
 Absorbing Man
 Boomerang
 Cardinal
 Dragonfly
 Moonstone
 Tiger Shark
 Whirlwind

The Avengers: Earth's Mightiest Heroes
 Baron Heinrich Zemo (leader)
 Abomination
 Chemistro
 Crimson Dynamo (Ivan Vanko)
 Enchantress
 Executioner
 Grey Gargoyle
 Living Laser
 Wonder Man

Marvel Disk Wars: The Avengers
 Red Skull (leader)
 Abomination
 Graviton
 Helmut Zemo
 MODOK
 Tiger Shark

Avengers Assemble
 Baron Helmut Zemo (leader)
 Beetle
 Goliath
 Fixer
 Moonstone
 Screaming Mimi

Marvel: Ultimate Alliance
 Doctor Doom (leader)
 Arcade
 Attuma
 Baron Mordo
 Bullseye
 Byrrah
 Crimson Dynamo (Valentin Shatalov)
 Dragon Man - He left the group.
 Enchantress - One of Doctor Doom's lieutenants.
 Executioner
 Fin Fang Foom
 Grey Gargoyle - He left the group.
 Lizard
 Loki - One of Doctor Doom's lieutenants.
 The Mandarin - He left the group after trying to take away the leadership position from Doctor Doom.
 Mephisto
 MODOK
 Mysterio
 Radioactive Man
 Rhino
 Scorpion
 Shocker
 Tiger Shark
 Ultron - One of Doctor Doom's lieutenants.
 Warlord Krang
 Winter Soldier
 Wrecking Crew
 Bulldozer
 Piledriver
 Thunderball
 The Wrecker

Masters of Evil